An Apsara is a female spirit from Hindu and Buddhist mythology.

Apsara may also refer to:

Arts, entertainment, and media

Fictional characters
Vina Apsara, a character in Salman Rushdie's novel The Ground Beneath Her Feet

Films
Apsara (film), a 1966 Khmer film directed by Head of State Norodom Sihanouk
Apsarassu, 1990 Indian Malayalam-language film
Aadmi Aur Apsara, Hindi title for Jagadeka Veerudu Athiloka Sundari, a 1990 Indian Telugu-language film

Other arts, entertainment, and media
Apsara Dance, a dance of the Royal ballet of Cambodia
Producers Guild Film Awards, formerly known as the Apsara Awards, Indian film and television awards

Geography
APSARA, the Authority for the Protection and Management of Angkor and the Region of Siem Reap
Apsarasas Kangri, mountain of the Karakoram
Apsarkonda, village in Karnataka, India

People
Apsara Reddy, Indian transgender politician

Other uses
Apsara, a technology stack for Alibaba Cloud
Apsara, India's first nuclear reactor at the Bhabha Atomic Research Centre
Apsara International Air, Cambodian airline operating 2013-2016
Apsarasa, a genus of moths in the family Noctuidae